Manchuria Aviation Company(traditional Chinese/Kyūjitai: 滿洲航空株式會社; simplified Chinese: 满州航空株式会社; Shinjitai: 満州航空株式会社;  Japanese Hepburn: Manshū Kōkū Kabushiki-gaisha, "MKKK")
was the national airline of Manchukuo.

Manchuria Aviation Company was established on 26 September 1931 in Fengtian by order of the Japanese Kwantung Army, out of the Manchurian branch office of Japan Air Transport, the forerunner of Imperial Japanese Airways. It officially adopted the name Manchuria Aviation Company on the proclamation of the independence of Manchukuo. Major shareholders were the Manchukuo government, the South Manchurian Railway Company and the Sumitomo zaibatsu.

From the beginning, the Manchuria Aviation Company was a paramilitary airline, whose primary purpose was to provide transport and logistical support for the military, and for the transport of mail. Civilian passengers were carried and charter operations undertaken on a lower priority.

In 1936, an "Independent Volunteer Battalion" of the MKKK consisting of 13 aircraft fought on the side of the Inner Mongolian Army against Kuomintang-held Suiyuan.

The airline had a "hub" in Hsinking and was linked by regular flight routes from Harbin, Shamussi (Kiamusze), Kirin, Mukden, Antung, Chinchow, Chengde, Tsitsihar, Hailar, and the Kwantung Leased Territory and Korea areas, for connections with Imperial Japanese Airways (Dai Nippon Koku KK) to Japan itself or foreign routes. A long distance route between Hsinking and Berlin was also pioneered in 1938.

The repair shops of the MKKK produced copies of the Fokker Super Universal (Nakajima Ki-6) and the De Havilland DH.80 "Pussmoth"

The Manchuria Aviation Company ceased operations in August 1945 during the Soviet invasion of Manchuria. However, wartime fuel and equipment shortages had previously curtailed its operations considerably. Remaining aircraft, goods and equipment were confiscated, to the benefit of the Soviet Union and Chinese Communist Party, after the conflict.

Fleet
 30x Manshū MT-1 Hayabusa airliner
 27x de Havilland DH.80 Pussmoth
 15x Messerschmitt Bf 108A/B Taifun liaison aircraft
 12x Nakajima AT-2 Thora transports
 10x Mitsubishi MC-20 Topsy transports
 10x Junkers Ju 86Z-1 transports/bombers
 10x Junkers Ju 86Z-2 transports/bombers
  2x Heinkel He 116A communications planes
  2x Fokker F.VIIb-3m/M transports
  1x Tachikawa Ki-54 Hickory transport
  1x de Havilland DH.85 Leopardmoth
  1x General Aviation GA-43 transport
  ?x Tachikawa Type LO Thelma transport (license build Lockheed Model 14-38 Super Electra)
  ?x Airspeed Envoy (license build Mitsubishi Type Hinazuru transport)
  ?x Manshū Super Universal (license built Fokker Super Universal)
  ?x Kawasaki Ki-56 Thalia transport
  ?x Kokusai Ki-59 transport

Accidents and incidents
 On June 20, 1941, Mitsubishi MC-20 (registration M-604) crashed in the Sea of Japan, killing all 18 on board.

References
Notes

Bibliography

 Jowett, Philip. Rays of the Rising Sun, Volume 1: Japan's Asian Allies 1931-45, China and Manchukuo. Helion and Company Ltd., 2005. .
 Mikesh, Richard C. and Shorzoe Abe. Japanese Aircraft, 1910-1941. London: Putnam Aeronautical Books, 1990. .

Defunct airlines of China
Companies in Manchukuo
Kwantung Army
1945 disestablishments in China
Chinese companies established in 1931
Transport companies disestablished in 1945
Airlines established in 1931
Airlines disestablished in 1945